Saturday Night at the Movies was a Canadian weekly television series. Saturday Night at the Movies may also refer to:
NBC Saturday Night at the Movies, an American weekly prime time network television series
"Saturday Night at the Movies" (song), a song by The Drifters, released in 1964, written by Barry Mann and Cynthia Weil
Saturday Night at the Movies (album), a 2017 album by Joe McElderry
Saturday Night at the Movies, a 2013 album by The Overtones